Acer henryi is an Asian species of maple. It has been found only in China (Anhui, Fujian, Gansu, Guizhou, Henan, Hubei, Hunan, Jiangsu, Shaanxi, Shanxi, Sichuan, Zhejiang).

Acer henryi is a small tree up to 10 meters tall, dioecious (meaning that male and female flowers are on separate trees). Leaves are compound with 3 leaflets, thin and papery, up to 12 cm wide and 5 cm across usually with 3 lobes, with a waxy, whitish underside. Leaflets sometimes have a few shallow teeth but no lobes.

References

External links
line drawing for Flora of China drawing 1 at top

henryi
Plants described in 1889
Flora of China
Dioecious plants